The 2002 FEI World Equestrian Games were held in Jerez de la Frontera, Spain, from September 10 to September 22, 2002. They were the 4th edition of the games which are held every four years and run by the FEI.

Venue 

The main venue was the Estadio Municipal de Chapín. It was remodeled for the event.

Officials
Appointment of (Olympic disciplines) officials is as follows:

Dressage
  Volker Moritz (Ground Jury President)
  Mariëtte Withages (Ground Jury Member)
  Jan Peeters (Ground Jury Member)
  Ernst Holz (Ground Jury Member)
  Elizabeth McMullen (Ground Jury Member)

Eventing
  Jean Scott Mitchell (Ground Jury President)
  Cara Whitham (Ground Jury Member)
  Christoph Hess (Ground Jury Member)
  Guy Othéguy (Technical Delegate)

Events
15 events in 7 disciplines were held in Jerez de la Frontera. 2002 was the first year that reining was held at the World Equestrian Games.

Medal summary

Medalists

Medal count

References

Equestrian sports competitions in Spain
FEI World Equestrian Games
International sports competitions hosted by Spain
Sport in Jerez de la Frontera
Equ
2002 in equestrian
September 2002 sports events in Europe
Horse driving competition